KRNG is a commercial radio station located in Fallon, Nevada, broadcasting to the Reno, Nevada area on 101.3 FM.  KRNG airs a Hot AC music format branded as "The Biggest Little Radio".

History
101.3 MHz in Fallon, Nevada went on air in 1997 Broadcasting a Christian Rock format. The station was branded as Renegade Radio and it was owned by Sierra Nevada Christian Music Association. On May 5, 2021 the frequency was bought by Juan C. Rodriguez. The station is now branded as the biggest little radio now broadcasting a Hot AC format.

Booster
KRNG is rebroadcast on the following FM booster:

External links
Official Website

RNG